Mich'ini (Aymara mich'i bow, -ni a suffix to indicate ownership, "the one with a bow", also spelled Michini) is a mountain in the Cordillera Real in the Andes of Bolivia, about  high. It lies in the La Paz Department, Los Andes Province, Batallas Municipality. Mich'ini is situated south-west of the mountains Wila Lluxi and Phaq'u Kiwuta, north-east of Tira K'ark'a and south-east of Kimsa Chata.

See also
 Q'ara Quta

References 

Mountains of La Paz Department (Bolivia)